Caesar Borgia, Son Of Pope Alexander The Sixth is a 1679 tragedy by the English writer Nathaniel Lee. It was first staged at the Dorset Garden Theatre by the Duke's Company. The prologue was provided by John Dryden.

The original cast included Thomas Betterton as Cesar Borgia, Joseph Williams as  Palante, William Smith as Machiavel, Thomas Gillow as  Paul Orsino, Anthony Leigh as Ascanio Sforza, Thomas Percival as  Vitellozzo, Mary Lee as  Bellamira and Emily Price as Adorna. The published version was dedicated to the Earl of Pembroke.

References

Bibliography
 Van Lennep, W. The London Stage, 1660-1800: Volume One, 1660-1700. Southern Illinois University Press, 1960.

1679 plays
West End plays
Tragedy plays
Cultural depictions of Cesare Borgia
Plays by Nathaniel Lee
Plays set in Italy
Plays set in the 15th century